Albert Rivaud (14 May 1876 – 15 September 1955) was a French philosopher and classical scholar. In 1908 he was appointed professor of philosophy at the University of Poitiers. In 1927 he succeeded Léon Brunschvicg as professor of philosophy at the Sorbonne. In 1940 he served briefly as Minister of National Education in the government of Philippe Pétain.

1876 births
1955 deaths
People from Nice
Academic staff of the University of Paris
Academic staff of the University of Poitiers
French philosophers
French classical scholars
French Ministers of National Education
French male non-fiction writers